Pearsonville is a census-designated place (CDP) in Inyo County, California, United States. The population was 17 at the 2010 census, down from 27 at the 2000 census. Pearsonville has been dubbed the "Hubcap Capital of the World" because of resident Lucy Pearson's collection of hubcaps, which are rumored to number over 80,000.

Geography

Demographics

2010
The 2010 United States Census reported that Pearsonville had a population of 17. The population density was 4.0 people per square mile (1.6/km). The racial makeup of Pearsonville consisted of 16 White people and one person from other races. One of those residents was Hispanic or Latino. The Census reported that all 17 residents lived in nine households, out of which three were married couples living together, one had a female householder with no husband present, and one had a male householder with no wife present. Four households were made up of individuals, and two had someone living alone who was 65 years of age or older. The average household size was 1.89 people. There were five families; the average family size was 2.40 people.

The population was spread out, with two people aged 18 to 24, one person aged 25 to 44, eight people aged 45 to 64, and six people who were 65 years of age or older. The median age was 59.8 years. The town had a female to male ratio of 10:7.

There were 16 housing units at an average density of 3.8 per square mile (1.5/km), of which nine were occupied, of which seven were owner-occupied, and two were occupied by renters. The homeowner vacancy rate was 12.5%. 15 people lived in owner-occupied housing units and two people lived in rental housing units

2000
As of the census of 2000, there were 27 people, 12 households, and 8 families living in the CDP. The population density was 6.4 people per square mile (2.5/km). There were 22 housing units at an average density of 5.2 per square mile (2.0/km). The racial makeup of the CDP was 88.89% White, 7.41% from other races, and 3.70% from two or more races. Hispanic or Latino of any race were 14.81% of the population.

There were 12 households, out of which 25.0% had children under the age of 18 living with them, 58.3% were married couples living together, 8.3% had a female householder with no husband present, and 33.3% were non-families. 33.3% of all households were made up of individuals, and 25.0% had someone living alone who was 65 years of age or older. The average household size was 2.25 and the average family size was 2.88.

In the CDP, the population was spread out, with 25.9% under the age of 18, 22.2% from 25 to 44, 40.7% from 45 to 64, and 11.1% who were 65 years of age or older. The median age was 46 years. For every 100 females, there were 125.0 males. For every 100 females age 18 and over, there were 81.8 males.

Politics

References

Census-designated places in Inyo County, California
Census-designated places in California